Phon Charoen is a district (amphoe) of Bueng Kan province, northeastern Thailand.

History
The minor district (king amphoe) Phon Charoen was established on 16 November 1976 by splitting two tambons from Bueng Kan district. It was upgraded to a full district on 13 July 1981.

Geography
Neighboring districts are (from the west clockwise) So Phisai, Mueang Bueng Kan, Si Wilai, and Seka of Bueng Kan Province, and Kham Ta Kla and Ban Muang of Sakon Nakhon province.

Administration
The district is divided into seven sub-districts (tambons), which are further subdivided into 58 villages (mubans). There are two sub-district municipalities (thesaban tambons): Phon Charoen covers parts of tambon Phon Charoen, and Don Ya Nang the whole tambon Don Ya Nang. There are a further six tambon administrative organizations (TAO).

References

External links
http://phoncharoen.orgfree.com Website of district (Thai)
amphoe.com

 
Districts of Bueng Kan province